An external water spray system (EWSS) is a domestic external fire sprinkler system designed to protect homes from bushfires and  wildfires. While external spray systems have long been used in fire protection for buildings and facilities, EWSS refers to domestic bushfire/wildfire systems.

Usage 
The types of systems vary greatly from a single impact sprinkler placed on a roof, systems installed during construction with sprays on all windows and doors, and small sprays damping gutters. Some are installed using copper piping and sprays while others use common PVC piping.

Usage depends on type of risk and belief of effectiveness. Copper piping is used to withstand high temperatures that may be experienced during a fire front or for higher reliability for in ceiling installations. External PVC piping is used where failure with exposure to high radiant heat is acceptable, as at the time the system is considered have "done its job". This is a matter of personal judgment.

Issues
There is a lack of scientific research regarding EWSS. Other issues that may affect the effectiveness of an EWSS:

 Sprinkler performance in high wind conditions typical in a bushfire
 Home design
 High vulnerability areas.  e.g. decking
 Garden beds near walls
 Window sills
 Large windows (heat radiation)
 Internal furnishings (e.g. curtains)
 Home location
 Slope
 Surrounding vegetation
 If defended by occupiers
 Preparation (if prepared for defense)
 If intended for remote (unattended) defense
 Available water supply
 Ember attack
 Fire front (radiant heat)
 Adjacent building or vegetation fire

Types
 Roof impact sprinkler
 Gutter sprays
 Window spray / deluge

Commercial sprays designed for EWSS are available, but most systems use commonly available irrigation sprinklers/sprays.

Research
External spray systems for buildings are well documented for protection from fires in adjacent buildings.  However, up there is little published scientific research on scientific information pertaining to the effectiveness of EWSS under varying wildfire conditions.

See also
 Active fire protection
 Passive fire protection
 Fire protection
 Fire protection engineering
 Architectural engineering

References

External links

National Fire Sprinkler Association
British Automatic Fire Sprinkler Association

Firefighting equipment
Safety equipment
Hydraulics
Plumbing
Piping
Fire suppression